Lord Porter may refer to:

George Porter, Baron Porter of Luddenham (1920–2002), British chemist and Nobel prize winner
Gary Porter, Baron Porter of Spalding, British Conservative politician and Chair of the Local Government Association 
Samuel Porter, Baron Porter (1877–1956), British judge